Gaius Calpetanus Rantius Sedatus was a Roman senator, who held a number of offices in the imperial service. He was suffect consul in the nundinium of March to April 47 with Hordeonius Flaccus as his colleague. He is known primarily from inscriptions.

His cursus honorum is known only piecemeal. The first known office Sedatus held was curator tabullarium publicorum in 45, a post reserved for senators of praetorian status. After he was suffect consul, the emperor Claudius appointed him governor of the province of Dalmatia.

His father was probably Gaius Calpetanus C.f. Statius Rufus. Gaius Calpetanus Rantius Quirinalis Valerius Festus, suffect consul in 71, has been identified as his adopted son.

References 

1st-century Romans
Suffect consuls of Imperial Rome
Roman governors of Dalmatia